Sergej Gorpishin (born 31 August 1997, in Erlangen) is a Russian handball player who plays for CSKA Moscow  and the Russian national team.

He represented Russia at the 2019 World Men's Handball Championship.

References

1997 births
Living people
Russian male handball players
Expatriate handball players
Russian expatriate sportspeople in Germany
Handball-Bundesliga players
Sportspeople from Erlangen
German people of Russian descent